Sir Michael O'Donel Bjarne Alexander  (19 June 1936 – 1 June 2002) was a British diplomat. He was the foreign policy secretary to Margaret Thatcher and the UK ambassador to NATO.

Alexander was the son of Hugh Alexander, the Anglo-Irish mathematician famed for his work at Bletchley Park. Michael spent much of his youth in his father's native Ireland. He was educated at Foyle College in Derry and, later, at St Paul's School, London, and King's College, Cambridge. He competed as a fencer for Great Britain at the 1960 Summer Olympics, winning a silver medal in the team épée event.

Alexander also served as Permanent Representative on the North Atlantic Council and Ambassador to Austria.

References

External links
 
Interview with Sir Michael Alexander & transcript, British Diplomatic Oral History Programme, Churchill College, Cambridge, 1998

1936 births
2002 deaths
Olympic fencers of Great Britain
Fencers at the 1960 Summer Olympics
Olympic silver medallists for Great Britain
Sportspeople from Hampshire
Olympic medalists in fencing
Knights Grand Cross of the Order of St Michael and St George
Permanent Representatives of the United Kingdom to NATO
Ambassadors of the United Kingdom to Austria
People educated at St Paul's School, London
Alumni of King's College, Cambridge
People from Winchester
People educated at Foyle College
Medalists at the 1960 Summer Olympics
British male fencers
English Olympic medallists